The Federal Medical Center, Butner (FMC Butner) is a United States federal prison in North Carolina for male inmates of all security levels who have special health needs. It is part of the Butner Federal Correctional Complex and is operated by the Federal Bureau of Prisons, a division of the United States Department of Justice. An adjacent satellite prison camp houses minimum-security male inmates.

It is located in Durham County, North Carolina, near Butner.

FMC Butner is located near the Research Triangle area of Durham, Raleigh, and Chapel Hill.

Facility and programs
FMC Butner has a full hospital facility specializing in oncology and behavioral science. Many medical and surgical specialties hold clinics and perform procedures at the FMC. It has the only residential program devoted to the treatment of individuals convicted of sexual offenses in the federal prison system.

In 2009 Philip Fornaci, the director of the DC Prisoners' Project, stated that FMC Butner, along with FMC Carswell and FMC Rochester, "are clearly the 'gold standard' in terms of what BOP facilities can achieve in providing medical care" and that they had provided "excellent medical care, sometimes for extremely complex medical needs."

Butner study
In 2009, a study conducted by psychologists Michael Bourke and Andres Hernandez was published in the Journal of Family Violence. The results suggested a strong link between viewing child pornography and sexual abuse. The findings went against the conventional and widely held belief that a person passively viewing child pornography had an insignificant causal link with that person actually molesting a child.

In what is known as the "Butner Study," Bourke and Hernandez analyzed data on 155 men convicted of child pornography offenses, who took part in an 18-month treatment program between 2002 and 2005, during which the men filled out assessment measures including a "victims list," where they revealed the number of children they had molested in the past.

74% of the men denied molesting anyone when they were sentenced. However, by the end of treatment, 85% had admitted to sexually molesting a child at least once. The numbers are more than twice that of other studies. In explaining this discrepancy, Bourke said, "Our treatment team worked for an average of 18 months with each offender, and the environment was one of genuine therapeutic trust" that encouraged the men to tell the truth about themselves.

A critique of the study is that the use of a population of participants in the most intensive sex offender treatment program offered in the federal prison system skewed the sample. Offenders had to have received at least a thirty-six-month sentence to be eligible for the program. Melissa Hamilton argues, "These offenders may well, then, have represented particularly dangerous offenders who were a high risk to children since they had been prosecuted, convicted, given more than minimal prison sentences, and accepted into the limited-space program because of a perceived need by themselves and program clinicians for a lengthy and intensive residential program."

Notable inmates

Former

Current

See also

List of U.S. federal prisons
Federal Bureau of Prisons
Incarceration in the United States

References

Buildings and structures in Granville County, North Carolina
Butner
Prisons in North Carolina